Kitzinger is a surname. Notable people with the surname include: 

 Albin Kitzinger (1912–1970), German football player
 Celia Kitzinger, British same-sex marriage activist
 Ernst Kitzinger (1912–2003), German-American art historian
 Sheila Kitzinger (1929–2015), British natural childbirth activist

Fictional characters
 Jilly Kitzinger, a fictional character in the science fiction series Torchwood